The Colombia–Ecuador border is an international boundary between the territories of Colombia and Ecuador. It consists of two sections, one terrestrial and one marine, well-defined:

The first section is a continuous line of 586 kilometres, running from east to west (from the Güepí River to the mouth of the river Mataje in Ancon de Sardinas Bay in the Pacific Ocean). It is about 28% of what was once the border between Colombia and Ecuador after the disintegration of the Great Colombia in 1830. The current land border was demarcated permanently by Muñoz-Suárez Vernaza Treaty on 15 July 1916.
The second tranche starts at the end point of the land boundary and runs 200 nautical miles offshore, as expressed in the law of the sea. This part was demarcated by the Liévano-Lucio Treaty August 23, 1975.

See also 
 Ecuador–Peru border

References 

 
Borders of Colombia
Borders of Ecuador
International borders